The Ministry of Health is the ministry of the Government of Turkey responsible for proposing and executing the government policy on health, planning and providing healthcare and protecting consumers. Likewise, it is responsible for proposing and executing the government policy on social cohesion and inclusion, family, protection of minors, youth and of care for dependent or disabled persons. The Ministry is headquartered in the Bakanlıklar in Ankara.

The Ministry of Health is headed by the Minister of Health, who is appointed by the President of Turkey at request of the Turkish Parliament. The current minister is Fahrettin Koca, serving since 10 July 2018.

History

Foundation of Ministry (1920–1946) 

Continuity and organization of healthcare were a key focus in the Seljuk-Ottoman medical tradition. Following the foundation of the Grand National Assembly of Turkey, the Ministry of Health was established on 3 May 1920. The main goal of this initial period was to heal the wounds of the war and to build the legislation rather than developing a regular registration system.

After the Republic was proclaimed, Dr. Refik Saydam held the ministerial office until 1937. Saydam contributed to the design and development of healthcare services in Turkey. In 1923, healthcare services were delivered at governmental and municipal facilities. The country had 86 hospitals and 6.437 patient beds back then.
During this period the Law on Practice of Medicine and Medical Sciences (1928) and the Law on Public Hygiene (1930) were adopted. These two and similar other laws are still in effect. 
The health policies during this era had four main pillars:
 Plan, design and implement healthcare centrally,
 Organize preventive care at central level and curative care at local administrations,
 Raise the appeal of medical faculties to citizens to increase the number of health workers and enforce mandatory service for medical faculty graduates,
 Launch programs to fight against communicable diseases like malaria, syphilis, trachoma and leprosy.

Under these pillars, healthcare services were based on the "single-purpose care in broad geography - vertical organization" model. Legislation was developed to promote preventive care and local administrations were encouraged to open hospitals. The objective was to have a government physician in every district. Starting from densely populated settlements, diagnostic and treatment offices were opened in 150 district centers in 1924 and 20 more in 1936. The salaries of physicians providing preventive care were raised and they were forbidden to engage in private practice.

National Health Plan and Program (1946–1960) 

The "First 10-Year National Health Plan", the first written health plan of Turkey, was adopted at the Supreme Health Council in 1946. The plan was announced by the Minister of Health Dr. Behçet Uz in 1946. It took nearly one and a half year for the National Health Plan to become a draft bill. It was approved by the Council of Ministers and at four different Parliamentary committees. However, the bill was not enacted because of the change of government.
Although the National Health Plan and the National Health Program were not entirely implemented in the form of a law, the two documents deeply influenced the healthcare organization around the country.

The basic approach was to centralize inpatient facilities that had been controlled by local administrations. The Plan aimed to expand healthcare to rural areas by establishing a 10-bed health center for every 40 villages. The care design of these facilities consisted of delivering preventive and curative services together. By design, each facility included two physicians, one health officer, one midwife, one visiting nurse and a village midwife and a health officer for every 10 villages. The number of the health centers was 8 in 1945, 181 in 1955 and 283 in 1960.

The Maternal and Child Health Section was established at the Ministry of Health in 1952. A Maternal and Child Health Development Center was established in Ankara in 1953 with assistance from UNICEF and World Health Organization. In this period, pro-natalist policies were adopted due to high rate of child and infection related mortalities. Therefore, Turkey continued to increase the number of health centers, maternity facilities and infection prevention centers and strengthened its corps of health professionals.

In 1954, the Minister of Health announced the "National Health Program and Health Bank Studies". Following on the First 10-Year National Health Plan, the Program provided the building blocks of healthcare planning and organization in Turkey. The National Health Plan split the country into seven health regions (i.e. Ankara, Balıkesir, Erzurum, Diyarbakır, İzmir, Samsun and Seyhan). On the other hand, the National Health Program divided the country into 16 health regions.

After İstanbul and Ankara universities, the medical faculty of Ege University started admitting students in 1955 in order to strengthen the health workforce. The number of physicians, nurses and midwives increased more than 100% in 10 years.

Both the National Health Plan and the National Health Program were aimed to provide health insurance to citizens for a fee, cover the treatment costs of the uninsured poor from a special administration budget, set up a health bank to finance healthcare costs, control production of drugs, serums and vaccines and create industries to produce milk and baby formulas. For this purpose, the Biological Control Laboratory and a vaccination station were established at Refik Saydam Public Hygiene Center in 1947. The production of intradermal BCG started in the same year. The production of pertussis vaccines started in 1948. The Workers' Insurance Administration (Social Insurance Institution) was created in 1946. Health facilities and hospitals for insured workers were opened after 1952.
In this period, legislation was developed for civil society organizations and various medical professions such as:
 Law on Turkish Medical Association (1953)
 Law on Pharmacists and Pharmacies (1953)
 Nursing Law (1954)
 Law on the Union of Turkish Pharmacists (1956)

Health Policies in the 1960–2002 Period 

Socialization in health was launched in 1963 and expanded to the whole country in 1983. Health posts, health centers and district and provincial hospitals were opened countrywide to provide extensive, continuous, integrated and staged healthcare. The Population Planning Law adopted in 1965 shifted the policy of the country from a pro-natalist to an anti-natalist policy. The Ministry of Health was authorized to establish a dedicated organization, obtain or manufacture or outsource provision of contraceptive drugs, provide citizens in need with such drugs for free or on a rate cheaper than the production cost or take measures to that effect.

In 1990, the State Planning Organization prepared the "Healthcare Sector Master Planning Study" together with the Ministry of Health. This basic plan on the healthcare sector marked the beginning of a process of addressing health reforms. The preparatory theoretical efforts for the health reforms gained momentum with the First and Second National Health Congress held in 1992 and 1993. This introduced the green card for poor citizens without social security. This allowed low-income people to be covered by health insurance although the care package was limited.
In 1993, the Ministry of Health developed the "National Health Policy" which consisted of five main components including support, environmental health, healthcare delivery and goals for healthy Turkey.

The main components of the Health Reform efforts in 1990s were as follows:
 Create General Health Insurance by merging all social security institutions,
 Introduce family practice for primary care,
 Grant autonomy to hospitals,
 Reorganize the Ministry of Health to become a planning and coordinating body with a special focus on preventive healthcare.
This was a period when major theoretical work was done but without noteworthy chances for implementation.

Health Transformation Program (2003–2013) 
The Government of Turkey started the Health Transformation Program (HTP) in 2003. To address the challenges, the World Bank has supported Turkey's Health Transformation Program since 2003 with two Adaptable Program Loans (APLs). The Bank also provided technical guidance, and shared the experiences of other countries. The Plan included the following targets under the title "Health for All":
 Reorganize the administration and functions of the Ministry of Health,
 Cover all citizens under universal health care,
 Merge all health facilities under a single body,
 Grant administrative and financial autonomy to hospitals,
 Introduce family medicine,
 Attach special focus on maternal and child health,
 Expand preventive healthcare,
 Promote private sector investment in healthcare,
 Delegate powers to lower levels in all public institutions,
 Address shortage of health professionals in priority development regions
 Launch digital transformation in health.

The Program was developed and launched in early 2003 based on the earlier experiences including socialization and subsequent health reform efforts. Complaints about long waiting lists decreased. Patients stranded in hospitals for failing to pay the bills became a thing of the past as the main concern was the provision of social insurance and universal health care. After addressing the emergency transportation issues, demands were now focused on qualified intensive care unit beds in sufficient numbers.

The 60th government of Turkey added three more points to HTP which are the promotion of healthy lifestyle, mobilizing stakeholders and multi-dimensional health responsibility for intersectoral collaboration and deliver cross-border health services which will for furthering Turkey's position internationally.

In 2003, only 39.5% of the population was satisfied with health services, whereas by 2011 this proportion had increased to 75.9%. In the same period, the overall health workforce increased by 36 percent, growing from 295,000 to 460,000.

Organization 
The following units are linked to the Ministry of Health:

 Internal Audit Unit
 Inspection Board
 Department of Strategy Development
 Office of Press and Public Relations
 Medicines and Medical Devices Institution
 General Directorate of Legal Services
 General Directorate of Emergency Health Services
 General Directorate of Health Promotion
 General Directorate of Administrative Services
 General Directorate of Health Investments
 General Directorate of Health Information System
 General Directorate of EU and Foreign Affairs
 General Directorate of Health Services
 General Directorate of Borders And Coastal Health of Turkey
 General Directorate of Turkish Public Hospitals
 General Directorate of Public Health

Ministers 

The first Turkish Minister of Health was Dr. Adnan Adıvar. The current minister is Dr. Fahrettin Koca, serving since 10 July 2018.

See also
 National Medical Rescue Team (UMKE)
 White Helmets (Syrian Civil War)
 Coronavirus Scientific Advisory Board (Turkey)
Air pollution in Turkey

References

External links
 Official Website
 
 
 

 

Health
Turkey
Turkey, Health
1920 establishments in the Ottoman Empire